Lygephila colorata is a moth of the family Erebidae first described by János Babics and László Aladár Ronkay in 2009. It is found in north-western Pakistan.

Adults differ from externally similar Lygephila amasina by the more elongated forewing with a pointed apex.

References

Moths described in 2009
Toxocampina